Landgrave Balthasar of Thuringia (21 December 1336 in Weißenfels – 18 May 1406 at the Wartburg in Eisenach) was Margrave of Meissen and Landgrave of Thuringia from the House of Wettin.

Life 
Balthasar was the second son of Frederick the Serious.  After his father's death in 1349, his elder brother Frederick the Austere acted as regent and guardian for Balthasar and his brothers William I and Louis.  After they came of age, William and Balthasar ruled jointly with Frederick.

After Frederick's death, a conflict arose between the brothers Balthasar and William on the one hand, and their nephews, Frederick the Warlike, William the rich and George on the other hand.  This was resolved on November 1382, with the so-called Division of Chemnitz in which Balthasar received the Landgraviate of Thuringia.

Marriage and issue 
Balthasar first married, in the spring of 1374, with Margaret, the daughter of Burgrave Albert of Nuremberg (d. 1390).   With her, he had a son and a daughter:
 Frederick the Peaceable, who succeeded him as Landgrave of Thuringia
 Anna of Meissen (d. 4 July 1395), who married Rudolf III, Duke of Saxe-Wittenberg

After Margaret's death, Balthasar married Anna of Saxe-Wittenberg (d. 1426), the widow of Duke Frederick I of Brunswick-Lüneburg.  This marriage remained childless.

Ancestry

References 
 

Landgraves of Thuringia
Margraves of Meissen
House of Wettin
People from Weißenfels
1336 births
1406 deaths
14th-century German nobility